Romeo Galán (born 7 June 1933) is an Argentine sprinter. He competed in the men's 100 metres at the 1952 Summer Olympics.

Competition record

References

1933 births
Living people
Athletes (track and field) at the 1952 Summer Olympics
Argentine male sprinters
Olympic athletes of Argentina
Place of birth missing (living people)
20th-century Argentine people